Neumann's law states that the molecular heat in compounds of analogous constitution is always the same. It is named after German mineralogist and physicist Franz Ernst Neumann.

References 

 L.F. Nilson and O. Pettersson, "On the molecular heat and volume of the rare earths and their sulphates," Proceedings of the Royal Society of London, Vol. 31,  pp. 46–51, 1880–81.

Laws of thermodynamics